Superbank (ซุปเปอร์แบงค์) is a Thai Muay Thai fighter

Biography

Superbank started training in muay thai at the age of 9 with his father.

Titles and accomplishments
Rajadamnern Stadium
 2010 Rajadamnern Stadium 105lbs Champion
 2011 Rajadamnern Stadium 115lbs Champion 
 2014 Rajadamnern Stadium Fighter of the Year
Lumpinee Stadium
 2013 Lumpinee Stadium 126lbs Champion
 2014 Lumpinee Stadium Fighter of the Year

Awards
 2014 Sports Authority of Thailand Fighter of the Year
 2014 Siam Sport Fighter of the Year

Fight record

|-  style="background:#fbb;"
| 2020-02-18|| Loss||align=left| Fonpanlan PKsaenchaimuaythaigym || Lumpinee Stadium|| Bangkok, Thailand || Decision || 5 || 3:00
|-  style="background:#fbb;"
| 2019-11-30|| Loss||align=left| Khumsap SuwitGym || MTGP32 || Perth, Australia || Decision || 5 || 3:00
|- 
! style=background:white colspan=9 |
|-  style="background:#cfc;"
| 2019-05-25|| Win ||align=left| Zac Einersen || Yokkao 40 || Sydney, Australia || Decision || 5 || 3:00
|-  style="background:#cfc;"
| 2019-03-29|| Win ||align=left| Paul Karpowicz || Yokkao 37 & 38 || United Kingdom || Decision || 5 || 3:00
|-  style="background:#cfc;"
| 2019-03-09|| Win ||align=left| Igor Liubchenko || All Star Fight || Bangkok, Thailand || Decision || 5 || 3:00
|-  style="background:#fbb;"
| 2019-02-14|| Loss||align=left|  Mongkolkaew Sor.Sommai  || Rajadamnern Stadium || Bangkok, Thailand || Decision || 5 || 3:00
|-  style="background:#c5d2ea;"
| 2018-10-18|| Draw ||align=left| Phetwason Or.Daokrajai || Rajadamnern Stadium || Bangkok, Thailand || Decision || 5 || 3:00
|-  style="background:#cfc;"
| 2018-09-06|| Win ||align=left| Sirimongkol PKSaenchai || Rajadamnern Stadium || Bangkok, Thailand || Decision || 5 || 3:00
|-  style="background:#fbb;"
| 2018-08-07|| Loss ||align=left| Rodtang Jitmuangnon ||  || Songkhla, Thailand || Decision || 5 || 3:00
|-  style="background:#cfc;"
| 2018-05-24|| Win ||align=left| Mongkolkaew Sor Sommai || Rajadamnern Stadium || Bangkok, Thailand || Decision || 5 || 3:00
|-  style="background:#cfc;"
| 2018-05-03|| Win ||align=left| Brandon Vieira || MFC 7 || France || Decision || 5 || 3:00
|-  style="background:#fbb;"
| 2018-02-26|| Loss ||align=left| Kaonar P.K.SaenchaiMuaythaiGym || Phoenix 5 Bangkok || Bangkok, Thailand || Decision || 5 || 3:00
|-  style="background:#cfc;"
| 2018-01-25|| Win ||align=left| Mongkolkaew Sor Sommai || Rajadamnern Stadium || Bangkok, Thailand || Decision || 5 || 3:00
|-  style="background:#cfc;"
| 2018-01-06|| Win ||align=left| Arthur Meyer || Rajadamnern Stadium || Paris, France || Decision || 5 || 3:00
|-  style="background:#fbb;"
| 2017-11-15|| Loss ||align=left| Phetwason Or.Daokrajai || Rajadamnern Stadium || Bangkok, Thailand || Decision || 5 || 3:00
|-  style="background:#fbb;"
| 2017-09-11|| Loss ||align=left| Kaonar P.K.SaenchaiMuaythaiGym || Rajadamnern Stadium || Bangkok, Thailand || Decision || 5 || 3:00
|-  style="background:#c5d2ea;"
| 2017-07-27|| Draw ||align=left| Kaonar P.K.SaenchaiMuaythaiGym || Rajadamnern Stadium || Bangkok, Thailand || Decision || 5 || 3:00
|-  style="background:#fbb;"
| 2017-05-03|| Loss ||align=left| Saeksan Or. Kwanmuang || Rajadamnern Stadium || Bangkok, Thailand || Decision || 5 || 3:00
|-  style="background:#cfc;"
| 2017-02-22|| Win ||align=left| Petnamngam Or.Kwanmuang || Rajadamnern Stadium || Bangkok, Thailand || Decision || 5 || 3:00
|-  style="background:#c5d2ea;"
| 2017-01-26|| Draw ||align=left| Saeksan Or. Kwanmuang || Rajadamnern Stadium || Bangkok, Thailand || Decision || 5 || 3:00
|-  style="background:#cfc;"
| 2016-12-21|| Win ||align=left| Petlamsin Sor.Kor.Sungaigym || Rajadamnern Stadium || Bangkok, Thailand || Decision || 5 || 3:00
|-  style="background:#fbb;"
| 2016-09-14|| Loss ||align=left| Panpayak Jitmuangnon || Rajadamnern Stadium || Bangkok, Thailand || Decision || 5 || 3:00
|-  style="background:#cfc;"
| 2016-08-03|| Win ||align=left| Fonluang Sitboonmee || Rajadamnern Stadium || Bangkok, Thailand || Decision || 5 || 3:00
|-  style="background:#cfc;"
| 2016-05-22|| Win||align=left| Thaksinlek Kiatniwat ||  Rajadamnern Stadium || Bangkok, Thailand || Decision || 5 || 3:00
|-  style="background:#cfc;"
| 2015-01-08|| Win ||align=left| Muangthai PKSaenchaimuaythaigym || Lumpinee Stadium || Bangkok, Thailand || Decision || 5 || 3:00
|-  style="background:#cfc;"
| 2014-12-09|| Win ||align=left| Thaksinlek Kiatniwat || Lumpinee Stadium || Bangkok, Thailand || Decision || 5 || 3:00 
|-  bgcolor="#cfc"
! style=background:white colspan=9 |
|-  style="background:#c5d2ea;"
| 2014-11-10|| Draw ||align=left| Thaksinlek Kiatniwat || Lumpinee Stadium || Bangkok, Thailand || Decision || 5 || 3:00
|-  style="background:#cfc;"
| 2014-10-08|| Win ||align=left| Thaksinlek Kiatniwat || Lumpinee Stadium || Bangkok, Thailand || Decision || 5 || 3:00
|-  style="background:#cfc;"
| 2014-09-05|| Win ||align=left| Thaksinlek Kiatniwat || Lumpinee Stadium || Bangkok, Thailand || Decision || 5 || 3:00
|-  style="background:#cfc;"
| 2014-08-14|| Win ||align=left| Pettawee Sor Kittichai || Rajadamnern Stadium || Bangkok, Thailand || Decision || 5 || 3:00
|-  style="background:#cfc;"
| 2014-07-16|| Win ||align=left| Pettawee Sor Kittichai || Rajadamnern Stadium || Bangkok, Thailand || Decision || 5 || 3:00
|-  style="background:#c5d2ea;"
| 2014-06-12|| Draw ||align=left| Saeksan Or. Kwanmuang || Rajadamnern Stadium || Bangkok, Thailand || Decision || 5 || 3:00
|-  style="background:#cfc;"
| 2014-05-06|| Win ||align=left| Superlek Kiatmuu9 || Lumpinee Stadium || Bangkok, Thailand || Decision || 5 || 3:00 
|-  bgcolor="#cfc"
! style=background:white colspan=9 |
|-  style="background:#fbb;"
| 2014-03-30|| Loss ||align=left| Superlek Kiatmuu9 || || Songkla, Thailand || Decision || 5 || 3:00
|-  style="background:#fbb;"
| 2014-02-28|| Loss ||align=left| Sangmanee Sor Tienpo || Lumpinee Stadium || Bangkok, Thailand || Decision || 5 || 3:00
|-  style="background:#cfc;"
| 2014-02-28|| Win ||align=left| Sam-A Gaiyanghadao || Lumpinee Stadium || Bangkok, Thailand || Decision || 5 || 3:00
|-  style="background:#cfc;"
| 2013-12-03|| Win ||align=left| Sam-A Gaiyanghadao || Lumpinee Stadium || Bangkok, Thailand || Decision || 5 || 3:00 
|-  bgcolor="#cfc"
! style=background:white colspan=9 |
|-  style="background:#cfc;"
| 2013-11-06|| Win ||align=left| Sangmanee Sor Tienpo || Rajadamnern Stadium || Bangkok, Thailand || Decision || 5 || 3:00
|-  style="background:#cfc;"
| 2013-10-08|| Win ||align=left| Thanonchai Thanakorngym || Lumpinee Stadium || Bangkok, Thailand || Decision || 5 || 3:00 
|-  bgcolor="#cfc"
! style=background:white colspan=9 |
|-  style="background:#cfc;"
| 2013-09-11|| Win ||align=left| Phet Utong Or. Kwanmuang || Rajadamnern Stadium || Bangkok, Thailand || Decision || 5 || 3:00
|-  style="background:#c5d2ea;"
| 2013-08-05|| Draw ||align=left| Singtongnoi Por.Telakun || Rajadamnern Stadium || Bangkok, Thailand || Decision || 5 || 3:00
|-  style="background:#cfc;"
| 2013-07-09|| Win ||align=left| Penake Sitnumnoi || Lumpinee Stadium || Bangkok, Thailand || Decision || 5 || 3:00 
|-
! style=background:white colspan=9 |
|-  style="background:#cfc;"
| 2013-06-03|| Win ||align=left| Singtongnoi Por.Telakun || Lumpinee Stadium || Bangkok, Thailand || Decision || 5 || 3:00
|-  style="background:#cfc;"
| 2013-04-05|| Win ||align=left| Rittidej Wor.Wanthavi || Lumpinee Stadium || Bangkok, Thailand || Decision || 5 || 3:00
|-  style="background:#cfc;"
| 2012-12-24|| Win ||align=left| Rittidej Wor.Wanthavi || Rajadamnern Stadium || Bangkok, Thailand || Decision || 5 || 3:00
|-  style="background:#fbb;"
| 2012-11-09|| Loss ||align=left| Nongbeer Chokngamwong || Lumpinee Stadium || Bangkok, Thailand || KO || 1 ||
|-  style="background:#cfc;"
| 2012-09-28|| Win ||align=left| Newwangjan Pagonponsurin || Lumpinee Stadium || Bangkok, Thailand || KO || 2 ||
|-  style="background:#c5d2ea;"
| 2012-06-28|| Draw ||align=left| Yodthongthai Por Telakun || Rajadamnern Stadium || Bangkok, Thailand || Decision || 5 || 3:00
|-  style="background:#cfc;"
| 2012-06-06|| Win ||align=left| Nongbeer Chokngamwong || Rajadamnern Stadium || Bangkok, Thailand || Decision || 5 || 3:00
|-  style="background:#cfc;"
| 2012-05-01|| Win ||align=left| Kaotam Lookprabaht ||  || Bangkok, Thailand || Decision || 5 || 3:00
|-  style="background:#cfc;"
| 2012-01-20|| Win ||align=left| Rungrat Tor.Pitakgollakan || Lumpinee Stadium || Bangkok, Thailand || Decision || 5 || 3:00
|-  style="background:#fbb;"
| 2011-10-20|| Loss ||align=left| Farsawang Tor Sangtiennoi || Rajadamnern Stadium || Bangkok, Thailand || Decision || 5 || 3:00
|-  style="background:#cfc;"
| 2011-08-18|| Win ||align=left| Yodthongthai Por Telakun || Rajadamnern Stadium || Bangkok, Thailand || Decision || 5 || 3:00 
|-  bgcolor="#cfc"
! style=background:white colspan=9 |
|-  style="background:#fbb;"
| 2011-03-15|| Loss ||align=left| Luknimit Singklongsi || Lumpinee Stadium  || Bangkok, Thailand || Decision || 5 || 3:00
|-  style="background:#cfc;"
| 2011-02-10|| Win ||align=left| Thaveesak Singklongsi ||  || Bangkok, Thailand || Decision || 5 || 3:00
|-  style="background:#cfc;"
| 2011-01-20|| Win ||align=left| Tiankao Tor.Sangtiennoi ||  || Bangkok, Thailand || Decision || 5 || 3:00
|-  style="background:#cfc;"
| 2010-12-23|| Win ||align=left| Tawanrung Ersampan||   || Bangkok, Thailand || Decision || 5 || 3:00
|-  style="background:#cfc;"
| 2010-10-21|| Win ||align=left| Prajanchai Por.Phetnamtong || Rajadamnern Stadium || Bangkok, Thailand || Decision || 5 || 3:00 
|-
! style=background:white colspan=9 |
|-  style="background:#cfc;"
| 2010-09-15|| Win ||align=left| Prajanchai Por.Phetnamtong || Rajadamnern Stadium || Bangkok, Thailand || Decision || 5 || 3:00 
|-  bgcolor="#cfc"
! style=background:white colspan=9 |
|-  style="background:#fbb;"
| 2010-08-27|| Loss||align=left| Yodtongthai Por.Telakun ||Lumpinee Stadium|| Bangkok, Thailand || Decision || 5 || 3:00
|-  style="background:#cfc;"
| 2010-05-13|| Win ||align=left| Excindicongym || Rajadamnern Stadium || Bangkok, Thailand || Decision || 5 || 3:00
|-  style="background:#cfc;"
| 2010-03-25|| Win ||align=left| Prabpram Tor.Chuchip|| Rajadamnern Stadium || Bangkok, Thailand || Decision || 5 || 3:00
|-  style="background:#fbb;"
| 2010-01-14|| Loss||align=left| Prajanchai Por.Phetnamtong || Rajadamnern Stadium || Bangkok, Thailand || Decision || 5 || 3:00
|-  style="background:#cfc;"
| 2009-10-14|| Win ||align=left| Dung Sor.Pernjit || Rajadamnern Stadium || Bangkok, Thailand || Decision || 5 || 3:00
|-  style="background:#cfc;"
| 2009-09-10|| Win ||align=left| Kan Nampatahoimook || Rajadamnern Stadium || Bangkok, Thailand || Decision || 5 || 3:00
|-  style="background:#fbb;"
| 2009-08-06|| Loss ||align=left| Dung Sor.Pernjit || Rajadamnern Stadium || Thailand || Decision || 5 || 3:00
|-  style="background:#cfc;"
| 2009-05-01|| Win ||align=left| Meknoi Sor.Danchai || Rajadamnern Stadium || Thailand || Decision || 5 || 3:00
|-  style="background:#cfc;"
| 2008-10-13|| Win ||align=left| Tongsak Jarernkasem || Rajadamnern Stadium || Bangkok, Thailand || Decision || 5 || 3:00
|-  style="background:#fbb;"
| 2008-07-14|| Loss ||align=left| Decha Kiatpatpan || Rajadamnern Stadium || Bangkok, Thailand || Decision || 5 || 3:00 
|-
| colspan=9 | Legend:

References

Superbank Mor Ratanabandit
Superbank Mor Ratanabandit
1994 births
Living people